Aureliachoerus was an extinct genus of suids that existed during the Miocene in Europe.

The species Aureliachoerus aurelianensis was originally considered a species of Palaeochoerus. The second species, A. minus was smaller than A. aurelianensis and had less complex molars.

References

Prehistoric Suidae
Miocene mammals of Europe
Miocene even-toed ungulates
Prehistoric even-toed ungulate genera